The Life of Agustín Lara (Spanish: La vida de Agustín Lara) is a 1959 Mexican musical film directed by Alejandro Galindo and starring Germán Robles, Lorena Velázquez and Ofelia Montesco. It is a biographical film about the life of the musician Agustín Lara.

Cast

References

Bibliography 
 Mora, Carl J. Mexican Cinema: Reflections of a Society, 1896-2004. McFarland & Co, 2005.

External links 
 

1959 films
1959 musical films
Mexican musical films
1950s Spanish-language films
Films directed by Alejandro Galindo
Films scored by Manuel Esperón
1950s Mexican films